Xiangjiangyuan Yao Township is an ethnic township of the Yao people in Lanshan County, Hunan, China. It is the home of the Yao people and is named after the source of the Xiang River. At the end of 2015, it had 742 resident families with a population of 3,188; the Yao people account for 95 percent of the population. The township is divided into five villages and part of the Jingzhu Forest Farm. The seat of the township is at the village of Tongcun.

History
The Xiangjiangyuan Yao Township historically was named Ziliang Ethnic Township, Qunfeng People's Commune, Ziliang Yao People's Commune and Ziliang Yao Township. The historic Ziliang Ethnic Township was formed in April 1950. It was renamed Qunfeng People's Commune in 1958. The Ziliang Yao People's Commune was reformed in 1961. The people's commune was transformed into a township in 1982. The Ziliang was allowed to renamed Xiangjiangyuan on November 18, 2015. The Xiangjiangyuan Yao Township was officially established on December 30, 2016.

Geography
The Xiangjiangyuan is a mountainous township located in the southeastern margin of Lanshan. It is bordered to the north and northeast by Suocheng Town, to the southeast by Daqiao Yao Township, to the south by Jingzhu Yao Township, to the west by Ningyuan County. The township is at 800 metres above sea level, the source of the Xiang River is at Yegou Mountain in Zhulin Village. It is also the location of the Xiangjiangyuan National Forest Park, established by the State Forestry Administration in 2008.

References

Townships of Hunan
Lanshan County
Yao ethnic townships